Barry Goudreau (born November 29, 1951) is an American musician. He was one of two original guitarists for the rock band Boston alongside founder Tom Scholz; both Scholz and Goudreau shared lead and rhythm guitar parts.

Before Boston 

Goudreau had developed a musical interest at an early age and got his first guitar, an acoustic which he borrowed from a friend, at age 11. He began taking lessons and by age 13, joined his first band, the "Tornadoes".  At age 15, he joined another band with future Boston bandmate drummer Sib Hashian. They would often play at nightclubs, sometimes seven times a week. Later, he met up with Brad Delp and Fran Sheehan, both future members of Boston. He auditioned for Delp's band, but did not make the cut.

When he went to college at Boston University, he sought to get a degree in Geology. He tried to put music aside to focus on school, but he soon met up with Tom Scholz who was right across the river at MIT.

with Boston 

Goudreau worked with Tom Scholz and Brad Delp as early as 1969 on an initial set of demo tapes, where he performed all of the rhythm and lead guitar work. These early attempts to attract record label interest did not succeed.

Later, Scholz re-worked and re-recorded some of these demo songs and wrote several new songs for a second set of demo tapes, this time with Scholz performing all of the guitar, bass and keyboard parts. This second demo set won a recording contract with Epic Records.

In late 1979, Scholz became involved in legal and contractual battles with the band's manager, and later with CBS. Thereafter, he informed the members of Boston that he would not be working on Boston material for at least a year and that they should feel free to do solo projects.

After Boston 
By this time, Goudreau had written many songs in hopes that Scholz would incorporate them into the next Boston LP.  Scholz did not express interest in using any of Goudreau's work. In 1980, Goudreau recorded his first solo LP titled Barry Goudreau, using Brad Delp and Fran Cosmo (Fran would join Boston in 1991) on vocals, and Sib Hashian on drums. The record company sought to cash in with this "almost Boston" line-up. The LP successfully hit the airwaves with the songs "Dreams" and "Mean Woman Blues". Scholz was unhappy with the album being put out and contacted Epic Records to stop further promotion of the album. Ultimately, it was this album that triggered Scholz to ask Goudreau to leave Boston.

In 1984, Goudreau formed the band Orion The Hunter and released a debut LP. This time, Fran Cosmo appeared as lead vocalist, while Delp provided backing vocals and co-wrote five of the album's songs. The album included the single "So You Ran". The band then added keyboardist and backing vocalist Brian Maes and toured in support of Aerosmith in 1984 but ultimately broke up in 1985.

In 1990, Goudreau formed the band RTZ (Return to Zero). Delp left Boston to join the band. RTZ experienced some success with the hits "Face the Music" written by Goudreau and Maes and "Until Your Love Comes Back Around" written by Maes. Delp and Goudreau felt that the record company was not supporting the band to the best of their abilities, and asked to be released from their contract. They later signed with MTM Records; however, Delp departed shortly after to rejoin Boston.

In 1997, Goudreau appeared with the Lisa Guyer Band on the album Gypsy Girl and in 2000 on the album Leap of Faith.

In 1998, RTZ regrouped to release their second album Lost with less success than the debut.

In 2003, Goudreau and Delp teamed up for their independent recording of Delp and Goudreau. The single "It's What You Leave Behind" received limited radio airplay.

In 2005, Goudreau and the members of RTZ released two CDs of songs that were earmarked for the never-realized third RTZ CD. The albums were released in the USA on Briola Records as Lost in America and Found in America. Goudreau continues to perform with Sheehan in small, local venues in the greater Boston area. He also played occasionally with Delp and Hashian until their deaths in 2007 and 2017, respectively.

On October 16, 2007, Goudreau released one final song with Delp on vocals titled "Rockin' Away". According to Goudreau, "'Rockin' Away' was written in the summer of 2006 for the 30th Anniversary of the release of the first "Boston" record. It was the last song that Brad and I wrote together. In it, Brad reflects on how he became involved in music, and thanks his many fans for their years of loyalty. It was my hope that the song might lead to a rekindling of my relationship with the band. Unfortunately it did not." The song was a minor hit in early 2008, charting up to #18 on the America's Music ranking of rock radio airplay.

Goudreau  was a member of Ernie and the Automatics with Sib Hashian, Tim Archibald, Brian Maes, Michael Antunes and "car guy" Ernie Boch, Jr. Their debut album Low Expectations was released on February 17, 2009. Ernie and the Automatics disbanded in 2011.

After Delp's death, the remaining RTZ members reunited to record "Set The Songbird Free", which was written by Brian Maes. "We wanted this to be a tribute to the love and respect that we all share for our bandmate and friend Brad," recalls Maes.

On February 25, 2012, Goudreau played a three-hour set with Sheehan and others in the "All Star Jam" to benefit the Sydney and Berne Davis Art Center in Ft Myers Florida.

Goudreau formed Barry Goudreau's Engine Room with Brian Maes, Tim Archibald, Tony DePietro, Mary Beth Maes, Joanie Cicatelli and Terri O'Soro. They released their first CD "Full Steam Ahead" in September 2017. Since 2014, Goudreau has also toured with the American Vinyl All Star Band, which also includes Jeff "Skunk" Baxter. Goudreau also occasionally appears with Scrap Metal, a supergroup formed by Gunner and Matthew Nelson, twin sons of Musician Ricky Nelson.

On September 3, 2022, Goudreau was inducted into the New England Music Hall of Fame while on stage at the Hampton Beach Casino Ballroom. 

Goudreau now lives with his wife Connie in Swampscott, Massachusetts. They have two children: Sean, a mortgage executive, and Michele, a health and wellness coordinator. They also have three grandchildren, Alyssa, Sammy and Matthew.

Discography

with Boston 
 Boston (1976)
 Don't Look Back (1978)
 Greatest Hits (1997)

Solo 
 Barry Goudreau (1980)

with Orion the Hunter 
 Orion the Hunter (1984)

with RTZ 
 Return to Zero (1991)
 Lost (1998)
 Lost and Found (2004)
 "Set The Songbird Free ..." (single) (2007)

with Brad Delp 
 Delp and Goudreau (2003)
 "Rockin' Away" (single) (2007)

with Ernie and the Automatics 
 Live at The Real Blues Festival (2006)
 Low Expectations (2009)

with Barry Goudreau's Engine Room 
 Full Steam Ahead (2017)
 The Road (2021)

References

External links 
 
 

1951 births
Living people
Musicians from Boston
American rock guitarists
American male guitarists
Boston (band) members
People from Swampscott, Massachusetts
Guitarists from Massachusetts
20th-century American guitarists